is a sports drink manufactured by The Coca-Cola Company. It originated in 1978, and was first introduced in 1983 in Japan as a grapefruit-flavored sports drink, as a response to a competitor's brand of sports drink called Pocari Sweat. It was introduced in Spain and Portugal in 1991, and was the official drink of the 1992 Summer Olympics in Barcelona, 1994 Winter Olympics in Norway, 2008 Summer Olympics in Beijing, 2016 Summer Olympics in Rio de Janeiro, and the 2020 Summer Olympics. The brand has been heavily marketed by giving away free samples in sporting events. 

Currently, it is marketed in Argentina, Belgium, Brazil, Chile, China, Germany, Hong Kong, Japan, Indonesia, Luxembourg, Macau, Morocco, the Netherlands, Peru, Portugal, Serbia, Singapore, Spain, Switzerland, Taiwan and Thailand. The majority of its consumers are non-athletes.
Aquarius is available in the following flavors: Citrus Blend, Grapefruit, Lemon, Orange, Watermelon, Red Peach, Blueberry and Tropical. The availability of these flavors changes from country to country.

In Malaysia, the Maldives and Brazil, bottled water is also available under the Aquarius brand.

Aquarius worldwide

Argentina
In Argentina, "Aquarius by Cepita" is a flavored water brand. Cepita is a local juice brand owned by Coca-Cola.
 Aquarius Pera (Pear flavored)
 Aquarius Manzana (Apple flavored)
 Aquarius Pomelo (Grapefruit flavored)
 Aquarius Uva (Grape flavored)
 Aquarius Naranja (Orange flavored)
 Aquarius Pomelo Rosado (Pink Grapefruit flavored)
 Aquarius Limonada (Lemonade flavored)

Belgium and Luxembourg
 Aquarius Red Peach
 Aquarius Lemon
 Aquarius Orange
 Aquarius Green Splash
 Aquarius Isotonic Blue Ice
 Aquarius Isotonic Cherry

Brazil
 Aquarius Fresh

Chile
In Chile, it is also available under the brand of "Aquarius by Andina".
 Aquarius Pera (Pear flavored)
 Aquarius Manzana (Apple flavored)
 Aquarius Uva (Grape flavored)
 Aquarius Piña (Pineapple flavored)
 Aquarius Limón (Lemon flavored)
 Aquarius Durazno (Peach flavored)

China
In China，it is sold under the brand of "Shuidongle" because Shanghai Maling Aquarius Co., Ltd.(), a subsidiary of Bright Food owns the trademark "Aquarius" in China.
 Aquarius (Grapefruit flavored)
 Aquarius (Lemon flavored)
 Aquarius (Orange flavored)
 Aquarius (Peach flavored)

Germany
 Aquarius Lemon (With Zinc)
 Aquarius Lime (With Magnesium)
 Aquarius Blood Orange (With Magnesium)

Hong Kong and Macau
Replaced Bonaqua BonActive in the early 2010s.
 Aquarius
 Aquarius Sparkling
 Aquarius Vitamin
 Aquarius Zero
 Water+ by Aquarius

Indonesia
 Aquarius

Japan
 Aquarius
 Aquarius Active Diet (Citrus Blend flavored)
 Aquarius Freestyle
 Aquarius Oasis
 Aquarius Real-Pro
 Aquarius Vitamin Guard
 Aquarius Sharp Charge
 Aquarius Zero
 Aquarius Water
 Aquarius Peach

Morocco
 Aquarius (Lemon flavored)

Netherlands
 Aquarius Blood Orange (With Magnesium)
 Aquarius Lime (With Magnesium)
 Aquarius Isotonic Blue Ice
 Aquarius Lemon
 Aquarius Orange
 Aquarius Isotonic Cherry

Peru
In Peru, "Aquarius Frugos" is sold nationwide in 500 ml plastic bottles.
 Aquarius Pera (Pear flavored)
 Aquarius Manzana (Apple flavored)
 Aquarius Piña (Pineapple flavored)
 Aquarius Naranja (Orange  flavored)

Portugal
 Aquarius (Lemon flavored)
 Aquarius Laranja (Orange flavored)
 Aquarius Zero Laranja (Sugarless, Orange flavored)

Serbia
 Aquarius Lemon (With Zinc)
 Aquarius Blood Orange (With Magnesium)

Spain
 Aquarius (Lemon flavored)
 Aquarius Naranja (Orange flavored)
 Aquarius Zero (Sugarless, Lemon flavored, previously known as Aquarius Libre)
 Aquarius Zero Naranja (Sugarless, Orange flavored, previously known as Aquarius Libre Naranja)

Switzerland
 Aquarius Lemon (With Zinc)
 Aquarius Blood Orange (With Magnesium)

Vietnam
 Aquarius

References 

Coca-Cola brands
Products introduced in 1983
Sports drinks
Japanese drinks